Cynghordy is a village in the rural community of Llanfair-ar-y-bryn in Carmarthenshire, Wales. It lies on the A483 road northeast of the town of Llandovery, and is served by Cynghordy railway station on the Heart of Wales Line.

Villages in Carmarthenshire